Danica Rice is a Canadian sprint kayaker who competed in the late-1990s. She won a silver medal in the K-4 200 m event at the 1997 ICF Canoe Sprint World Championships in Dartmouth, Nova Scotia.

References

Year of birth missing (living people)
Living people
Canadian female canoeists
ICF Canoe Sprint World Championships medalists in kayak